Hugh Aloysius Donohoe (June 28, 1905 – October 26, 1987) was an American prelate of the Roman Catholic Church.  He served as bishop of the Diocese of Fresno in California from 1969 to 1980.  

Donohoe previously served as an auxiliary bishop of the Archdiocese of San Francisco from 1947 to 1962 and as bishop of the Diocese of Stockton in California from 1962 to 1969.

Biography

Early life 
Born in San Francisco, California on June 28, 1905, Donohoe was educated at St. Patrick Seminary in Menlo Park, California, and at the Catholic University of America in Washington, D.C.

Donohoe was ordained to the priesthood on June 14, 1930. He then served as a professor at St. Patrick Seminary (1930–42) and editor of The Monitor (1942 to 1947). He became known as a prominent Catholic labor activist.

Auxiliary Bishop of San Francisco 
On August 2, 1947, Donohoe was appointed as an auxiliary bishop of the Archdiocese of San Francisco and titular bishop of Taium by Pope Pius XII. He received his episcopal consecration on October 7, 1947, from Archbishop John Mitty, with Bishops James Sweeney and Thomas Connolly serving as co-consecrators.

Donohoe was appointed in 1948 as rector of the Cathedral of Saint Mary of the Assumption in San Francisco.

Bishop of Stockton 
Pope John XXIII named Donohoe as the first bishop of the newly erected Diocese of Stockton on January 27, 1962.  He was installed on April 24, 1962.  He attended all four sessions of the Second Vatican Council in Rome between 1962 and 1965.

Bishop of Fresno 
Pope Paul VI appointed Donohoe on August 22, 1969, as bishop of the Diocese of Fresno.

On July 1, 1980, Pope John Paul II accepted Donohoe's resignation as bishop of Fresno.Hugh Donohoe died in Fresno, California, on October 26, 1987, at age 82.

References

Episcopal succession

1905 births
1987 deaths
Clergy from San Francisco
Roman Catholic Archdiocese of San Francisco
Catholic University of America alumni
Saint Patrick's Seminary and University alumni
People from Fresno, California
Roman Catholic bishops of Stockton
20th-century Roman Catholic bishops in the United States
Participants in the Second Vatican Council